The Glens of Antrim, known locally as simply The Glens, is a region of County Antrim, Northern Ireland. It comprises nine glens (valleys), that radiate from the Antrim Plateau to the coast. The Glens are an area of outstanding natural beauty and are a major tourist attraction in north Antrim.

The main towns and villages in the Glens are Ballycastle, Cushendun, Cushendall, Waterfoot, Carnlough and Glenarm.

The Lordship of the Glens 
From the mid-13th century onward, the Lordship of The Glens belonged to the Bissett family, Anglo-Norman in origin but Gaelicized over generations. With the marriage of John Mor Macdonald, second son of John of Islay, Lord of the Isles, to Margery Bisset in the late 14th century, the Glens came into the ownership of the MacDonnells of Antrim. John Mor gained the title Lord of Dunyvaig and the Glens.

The nine glens
From north to south, the nine glens are:

Tenth glen
Glenravel is sometimes considered a tenth glen. It lies to the southwest of Glenballyeamon and Glenariff, being separated from the latter by the Glenariff forest park.

The main settlements of Glenravel are Cargan, Martinstown and Skerry (Newtowncrommelin).

Archaeology

Artifacts of the Neolithic period have been found in various places of the Glens of Antrim including Bay Farm II and Madman's Window.

In popular culture
The Glens are mentioned in the song "Ireland's Call".  DI Sean Duffy, in the Troubles mysteries by Adrian McKinty, is from the Glens.

See also
Glens of Antrim Historical Society

References

External links

Glens of Antrim Website
Glens of Antrim Historical Society
Landscapes Unlocked - Aerial footage from the BBC Sky High series explaining the physical, social and economic geography of Northern Ireland.

Areas of Outstanding Natural Beauty in Northern Ireland
Glens of Ireland
 
Protected areas of County Antrim
Earldom of Ulster